Craig Call Black (1932–1998) was an American paleontologist noted for his studies of the vertebrate mammals of the Ice Age. He served as the director of the Museum of Texas Tech University 1972-1975, Carnegie Museum of Natural History 1975-1982 and the Natural History Museum of Los Angeles County 1982-1994. In 1982, President Ronald Reagan appointed him to serve on the National Museum Services Board. In 1985, Reagan nominated him to serve on the National Science Board for a period of five years succeeding David V. Ragone. In 1991, President George H. W. Bush appointed him to serve on the Environment for the Americas Board.

Early life
Black was born in Peking, China on May 28, 1932 to Commander Dr. Arthur P. Black, US Navy, and Mary Nichols Black, of El Paso, Texas. He graduated from Kent School in 1950 and received a bachelor's degree from Amherst College in 1954 and a master's degree in 1957. He received a PhD from Harvard University in 1962.

Career
Black served as the president of the American Association of Museums, the Association of Science Museum Directors, Society of Vertebrate Paleontology (1970-1971) and the Paleontological Society (1995). He was a fellow of the Geological Society of America and a member of the Society for the Study of Evolution. While serving at the University of Kansas Natural History Museum in 1972, he is credited with naming the owl species E. Martinellii after paleontologist Jorge Martinelli who discovered the fossil remains. He was recognized for his support of archaeological work.

In 1987 the Blacks hosted Andre Kapitsa, the deputy secretary general of the Soviet Union's Academy of Sciences, at their home.

Work
Black authored a number of works. Select publications are listed below:
 A Review of the North American Tertiary Sciuridae, 1963
 A new Pareumys (Rodentia: cylindrodontidae) from the Duchesne River Formation, Utah, 1970
 History and prehistory of the Lubbock Lake site, 1974
 Papers on Fossil Rodents in Honor of Albert Elmer Wood (with Mary R. Dawson), 1989

References

1932 births
1998 deaths
American paleontologists
Amherst College alumni
Directors of museums in the United States
Fellows of the Geological Society of America
Harvard University alumni
Kent School alumni
Scientists from Beijing
United States National Science Foundation officials
American expatriates in China